"Does My Ring Burn Your Finger" is a song written by Julie Miller and Buddy Miller, and recorded by American country music artist Lee Ann Womack.  It was released in October 2001 as the fourth and final single from her third studio album, I Hope You Dance.  The song peaked at number 23 on the Billboard Hot Country Singles & Tracks.

Critical reception
Chuck Taylor of Billboard called the song "A haunting hillbilly treatise on the pain of betrayal and loss" They also wrote, "From the opening Appalachian twang of a mournful-sounding fiddle to Womack's achingly beautiful delivery, this is one intriguing record. The production strikes a balance between country radio's standard expectations and artistic inventiveness. Liddell and Womack color outside the lines here with a decidedly bluegrass feel, yet they keep it sonically in tune with current radio fare. For her part, Womack again displays an uncanny ability to inhabit a song-turning in a performance that reverberates with hurt and disillusionment. It adds up to a vibrant record that both fans and programmers should find impossible to ignore."

Ken Barnes of USA Today listed the song as the number one single of 2001 and wrote, " A searing, chill-conjuring performance of a seething Buddy and Julie Miller tune by country's reigning female vocalist."

Live performances
Womack performed the song on The Today Show on August 18, 2001

Chart performance
"Does My Ring Burn Your Finger" debuted at number 58 on the U.S. Billboard Hot Country  Singles & Tracks for the week of November 10, 2001.

References

2001 singles
2000 songs
Lee Ann Womack songs
MCA Nashville Records singles
Song recordings produced by Frank Liddell